The 2021 Mountain West Conference Football Championship Game was a college football game played on December 4, 2021, at Dignity Health Sports Park in Carson, California. It was the ninth edition of the Mountain West Conference Football Championship Game and determined the champion of the Mountain West Conference (MWC) for the 2021 season. The game began at 12:00 p.m. PST and was aired on Fox. The game featured the Utah State Aggies, the Mountain Division champions, and the San Diego State Aztecs, the West Division champions. San Diego State won the right to host the game as a result of having the better conference record between the two teams.

Previous season
The 2020 Mountain West Conference Football Championship Game featured Boise State against San Jose State. In the championship game, San Jose State was victorious by a score of 34–20, winning its first Mountain West championship.

Teams

Utah State Aggies
Utah State clinched the Mountain Division championship with a victory at New Mexico on November 26. The Aggies finished with a conference record of 6–2 and held the head-to-head tiebreaker over Air Force thanks to their win over the Falcons on September 18. Utah State will be making their first conference championship game appearance since the inaugural contest in 2013, and are seeking their first Mountain West Conference championship.

San Diego State Aztecs
San Diego State clinched the West Division championship outright with a conference record of 7–1 after beating Boise State on November 26. The Aztecs will be making their first conference championship game appearance since their victory in 2016.

This was the Aztecs' final game at their temporary home of Dignity Health Sports Park. They will move into their new home of Aztec Stadium, built on the site of their former home of San Diego Stadium, in 2022.

Game summary

Statistics

References

Championship Game
Mountain West Conference Football Championship Game
Mountain West Championship Game
San Diego State Aztecs football games
Utah State Aggies football games
Mountain West Conference Football